Club Deportivo Orellana Costa Dulce is a Spanish football team based in Orellana la Vieja, in the autonomous community of Extremadura. Founded in 1979, it plays in Segunda Division Extremeña, holding home games at Polideportivo Municipal de Orellana la Vieja.

Season to season 

3 seasons in Tercera División

External links
Official website 
Futbolme.com profile
fexfutbol.com profile

Football clubs in Extremadura
Association football clubs established in 1979
Divisiones Regionales de Fútbol clubs
1979 establishments in Spain
Province of Badajoz